Lester Thomas Parker (May 27, 1900 – August 8, 1974) was an American politician in the state of Washington. He served in the Washington State Senate from 1943 to 1951. From 1949 to 1951, he was President pro tempore of the Senate.

References

Republican Party Washington (state) state senators
1900 births
1974 deaths
20th-century American politicians